Lost Song (stylized as LOST SONG) is a musical fantasy anime television series produced by Liden Films in collaboration with Dwango and Mages. The series follows Rin and Finis, two girls with opposite backgrounds and personalities yet sharing the commonality of performing miraculous songs worthy of healing, wind, water and fire. Rin and Finis each embark on an arduous journey during a time of war in the kingdom, and they must find each other in order to sing a duet that will restore world peace once again. The project stars musician Konomi Suzuki as Rin and voice actress Yukari Tamura as Finis. The series was revealed in an announcement during a birthday concert held by Suzuki in November 2016. The series was first released online in Japan through Netflix on March 31, 2018, followed by a TV airing on Tokyo MX, SUN, TVA, BS Fuji and KBS on April 7, 2018. Netflix began streaming the series globally on September 30, 2018.

Plot 
Rin is an energetic girl who lives in a grassy frontier village. Finis spends her days in solitude deep within the royal palace in the bustling capital city. While the girls appear to be opposites, they share a special power that no other person has—the power of song, which can heal wounds, create and control the elements water, fire, earth, and air. Guided by destiny, the two young women each face an arduous journey as the shadow of war looms over the kingdom, tainting their miraculous songs with the blood of innocents. Loved ones meet their deaths as silent screams echo through a stone prison, and Rin and Finis hope that their last song will be one of hope.

Characters

Rin is an energetic young brown-haired girl harboring a passion for singing living with her adopted younger brother Al, adopted older sister Mel and grandfather Talgia Hawklay in a reclusive village near a forest. She discovers her ability to sing Spirit Songs, legendary songs that can manipulate the four elements of the world and bring about miracles. Unlike Finis, her songs energize her instead of taking away her lifespan. After Mel and Talgia died, she promised to live her dream of singing with the Court Orchestra in the Capital and save as many lives as she can with her powers. Rin was originally a part of Finis, the last bit of Finis's hope of her feelings for Henry and Song of Healing, who came to existence after Finis sang the destructive and deathly Song of Mortality. Singing the Song of Healing to grant Finis's wish to restore the world to its former state ultimately would lead to her "death" but follows through regardless. After the duet of the Lost Song is completed, Rin vanishes and emerges with Finis as the verse states that hope (Rin herself) would disappear after the ultimate wish was fulfilled. A memorial is created using the original Henry Leobolt's sword as a marker. However, with the revelation of Finis's pregnancy, implies that Rin may indeed be reborn as her daughter in her next life.

Finis is a beautiful, clumsy, naïve and innocent young woman with the uniquely powerful ability to sing Spirit Songs, although they eat away at her lifespan each time she does. Because of her ability, she was captured and married to the Prince to work as a human weapon for war. Believing she was helping people and later for her lover Henry, she followed his orders until she accidentally killed Henry, driving her to snap and unleash a forbidden song's incredible deathly and destructive powers onto the world out of sheer sorrow and rage. Unfortunately, the Song of Mortality was designed to gift her immortality in exchange for the gradual annihilation and continuous reset of the world. After singing the Lost Song, her hope (Rin) returned to her. The last scene seen of her is when Corte finds her, heavily pregnant; indicating that Rin may be reborn as her firstborn child.

Al is Rin and Mel's younger brother. He is introduced as a boy who wants to go to the Capital to show off his prototype inventions. His weapon of choice is his Star Bombs, firecracker bombs which act as a smokescreen. He later becomes an apprentice under Dr. Weissen and separates from Rin and the others. However, he returns in his jet pet fueled with Dr. Weissen's echo devices to save Rin from being attacked by Bazra. Al also combines efforts with Henry to defeat Bazra after he was equipped with the new model of the Symphony Killer.

Pony is a kind court minstrel that used to work at the palace and Rin and Al's first companion on their journey to the Capital. She was the eye of the alternate Henry after see her perform; according to Henry, she was originally thought to be lost during war. She has a great talent for music and is often seen carrying a portable piano around to play songs on. After she quit her job, she got most of her money from winning bets. She also has a great fear of bugs and can appreciates flattery. She is revealed to be none other than Princess Alea Golt who had mysterious disappeared. She later becomes Queen of Golt, with Henry as general. 

Monica is Allu's younger sister and a rhythmist. It is characteristic of her to wear a pink zipper bunny suit, and fall asleep when she is afraid. Along with Allu, she gave up her dream of entering the Court Orchestra to work as rhythmists to heal their mother's blindness. Apart from drumming and keeping time, she is also a good singer, and can imitate any music perfectly after hearing it just once, so she can greatly amplify the strength and effects of Rin's song from time to time.

Allu is Monica's oldest sister and a rhythmist. She is the bravest of the sisters and is very protective of her younger sister, although sometimes her harsh attitude can come off as rude. Along with Monica, she gave up her dream of entering the Court Orchestra to work as rhythmists to heal their mother's blindness.

Henry is a handsome, brave and caring knight well known for his noble family heritage and expert swordsmanship. Because he was the only one that looked at Finis as a human instead of a weapon, she fell in love with him and so did he. He is accidentally and unknowingly killed by Finis, who did not know it was him; after Prince Rudo fooled her into executing a traitor. He reincarnated several time during different eras; such as being witness to Finis's being burned at the stake to a bespectacled scientist who is married with a young daughter; meeting Finis in some form; and in some cases, witnessing her destructive and deathly Song of Mortality firsthand, as it was his demise that had caused her to snap and sing the forbidden song of mortality that contained such destructive power.

Corte is Finis's personal maid who is one other person who cared for her as a human. While trying to feed the Prince Rudo poison to let her lady and Henry escape together. However, she is found out and the plan backfiring; she is then and forced to drink the poison. Her final moments was the sight of Finis and Henry. After the world is saved from yet another reset, she became the pregnant Finis's protector once again.

Mel is Al and Rin's older sister who also acts as a motherly figure to them. She is found by Rin and Al mortally wounded. Rin tries to use her Song of Healing to save her, but comes too late. She wished for Rin to sing at the Capital before ultimately dying from her wounds.

Bazra is the ruthless general of the army and Talgia's successor. Unlike his predecessor, he is a ruthless, violent and wicked man that withholds information from the royal family for his personal gain. He started as a regular mercenary, but then stumbled upon Finis and witnessing her power firsthand; used her powers as a tool of war and rising in the ranks of the Capital Army as General; much to Talgia, Dr. Weissen, and Henry's disdain. Talgia dueled him, but cheated using one of Dr. Weissen's inventions causing him to burn Talgia's right hand.  After he and his men witness Rin use song to heal Henry, he decides to attack Rin's village; once again crossing paths with Talgia; which resulted in the incineration of the village, and the demise of Mel and Taiga. Bazra attempted to use the Symphony Killer weapon to destroy the elderly King of Golt, but is ultimately killed by the combined efforts of Henry and Al.

Rudo is the cunning, manipulative and coldhearted prince of the country. He desires to use Finis as a human weapon to win the war. After he used her to "cremate" Henry Leobolt, he was incinerated by the saddened and enraged Finis' Song of Mortality's destructive powers. 
During Rin's present, now known as Prince Rudo Golt, he looks a bit more younger and has blond hair. He is also Princess Alea Golt's younger brother.  Unlike the original, he was opposed to using Finis as a human weapon.  He was oppose to General Bazra's methods as not only it was reckless, but put the kingdom's economy in jeopardy. After, General Bazra's attack, he fell into the waterfall, but was saved by Henry's loyal men, Berrow and Snore; also, telling him that the King of Golt has died causing him to curse Bazra. He is present at his elder sister's, Princess Alea, side during her coronation.

Dr. Weissen is a famous scientist, physicist and inventor that used to conduct research for the army in bringing about peace for the country. With the beginning of the war, Bazra and the army started to use his inventions for killing purposes by enhancing the destructive nature of Finis's songs; to which Dr. Weissen disapproved of. As such, they submerged his entire lab, drowned his lab assistants, and stole his inventions, in addition to making him lose hope. Upon meeting Rin and her companions, she saved his lab and he lets Al stay with him as his assistant. He was the best friend of Talgia and was surprised to learn that Rin was his granddaughter. He is also the first to learn from Rin about the unfortunate consequences of singing the Song of Healing during the Starsong Festival.

Talgia is Al, Rin and Mel's grandfather who strongly disapproves of Rin singing, revealing that he knew about her power ever since she was young as he knew the Capital would attempt to use Rin as a human weapon just like Finis. Before he moved to the village, he was a strong commander and general in the army until he started to realize its brutal methods of violence and bloodshed. He dueled with Bazra in attempts from stopping him from using the Song of Mortality; but lost due to Bazra using one of Weissen's echo devices, which burned his right arm and rendered it immobile. However, a young Rin used her Song of Healing to heal it entirely; thus he had vowed to protect Rin from the Capital. He was also a good friend of Dr. Weissen.

Berrow is burly bearded man who wields a giant axe. His first incarnation was a cynical mercenary who fought the front lines and mocked Henry for being a spoiled rich kid and tried to scare him saying the front line soldiers are discarded trash meant to die. However, over time and having witnessed Henry's resolve, he begins to respect him. He also comes to befriend Finis. After the end of the war, he swears loyalty to Henry. It is unclear of his first demise either by execution for swearing loyalty to Henry or a portion of the deathly Song of Mortality.
His current self is no different from his past self, but seems to be more cheerful with blonde. He serves as a member of Henry's rebellion against the Capital.

Snore is skinny man who wields a saber. Like Berrow, was a mercenary who served the front lines. He also comes to befriend Finis. After the end of the war, he swears loyalty to Henry. It is unclear of his first demise, either by execution for swearing loyalty to Henry or the Song of Mortality.
His alternate is more or less the same. He serves as a member of Henry's rebellion against the Capital.

Media

Anime

Both songs were released on May 23, 2018.

A new project was announced on September 24, 2018.

Notes

References

External links
 

2018 anime ONAs
Japanese adult animated adventure television series
Japanese adult animated fantasy television series
Mages (company)
Adventure anime and manga
Anime with original screenplays
Drama anime and manga
Dwango (company)
Japanese-language Netflix original programming
Liden Films
Music in anime and manga
Netflix original anime
Romance anime and manga
Steampunk anime and manga
Tokyo MX original programming